Wheat is a grass widely cultivated for its seed, a cereal grain that is a worldwide staple food. The many species of wheat together make up the genus Triticum ; the most widely grown is common wheat (T. aestivum).  The archaeological record suggests that wheat was first cultivated in the regions of the Fertile Crescent around 9600 BCE. Botanically, the wheat kernel is a type of fruit called a caryopsis.

Wheat is grown on more land area than any other food crop (2014). World trade in wheat is greater than for all other crops combined.

Since 1960, world production of wheat and other grain crops has tripled and is expected to grow further through the middle of the 21st century. Global demand for wheat is increasing due to the unique viscoelastic and adhesive properties of gluten proteins, which facilitate the production of processed foods, whose consumption is increasing as a result of the worldwide industrialization process and the westernization of the diet.

Wheat is an important source of carbohydrates. Globally, it is the leading source of vegetable proteins in human food, having a protein content of about 13%, which is relatively high compared to other major cereals but relatively low in protein quality for supplying essential amino acids. When eaten as the whole grain, wheat is a source of multiple nutrients and dietary fiber.

In a small part of the general population, glutenthe major part of wheat proteincan trigger coeliac disease, noncoeliac gluten sensitivity, gluten ataxia, and dermatitis herpetiformis.

Origin and history 

Cultivation and repeated harvesting and sowing of the grains of wild grasses led to the creation of domestic strains, as mutant forms ('sports') of wheat were preferentially chosen by farmers. In domesticated wheat, grains are larger, and the seeds (inside the spikelets) remain attached to the ear by a toughened rachis during harvesting. In wild strains, a more fragile rachis allows the ear to easily shatter and disperse the spikelets. Selection for larger grains and non-shattering heads by farmers might not have been deliberately intended, but simply have occurred because these traits made gathering the seeds easier; nevertheless such 'incidental' selection was an important part of crop domestication. As the traits that improve wheat as a food source also involve the loss of the plant's natural seed dispersal mechanisms, highly domesticated strains of wheat cannot survive in the wild.

Archaeological analysis of wild emmer indicates that it was first cultivated in the southern Levant, with finds dating back as far as 9600 BC. Genetic analysis of wild einkorn wheat suggests that it was first grown in the Karacadaǧ Mountains in southeastern Turkey. Dated archaeological remains of einkorn wheat in settlement sites near this region, including those at Abu Hureyra in Syria, suggest the domestication of einkorn near the Karacadaǧ Mountains. With the anomalous exception of two grains from Iraq ed-Dubb, the earliest carbon-14 date for einkorn wheat remains at Abu Hureyra is 7800 to 7500 years BC.

Remains of harvested emmer from several sites near the Karacadag Range have been dated to between 8600 (at Cayonu) and 8400 BC (Abu Hureyra), that is, in the Neolithic period. With the exception of Iraq ed-Dubb, the earliest carbon-14 dated remains of domesticated emmer wheat were found in the earliest levels of Tell Aswad, in the Damascus basin, near Mount Hermon in Syria. These remains were dated by Willem van Zeist and his assistant Johanna Bakker-Heeres to 8800 BC. They also concluded that the settlers of Tell Aswad did not develop this form of emmer themselves, but brought the domesticated grains with them from an as yet unidentified location elsewhere.

The cultivation of emmer reached Greece, Cyprus and Indian subcontinent by 6500 BC, Egypt shortly after 6000 BC, and Germany and Spain by 5000 BC.  "The early Egyptians were developers of bread and the use of the oven and developed baking into one of the first large-scale food production industries." By 4000 BC, wheat had reached the British Isles and Scandinavia. Wheat likely appeared in China's lower Yellow River around 2600 BC.

The oldest evidence for hexaploid wheat has been confirmed through DNA analysis of wheat seeds, dating to around 6400–6200 BC, recovered from Çatalhöyük. The first identifiable bread wheat (Triticum aestivum) with sufficient gluten for yeasted breads has been identified using DNA analysis in samples from a granary dating to approximately 1350 BC at Assiros in Macedonia.

From Asia, wheat continued to spread across Europe and to the Americas in the Columbian exchange. In the British Isles, wheat straw (thatch) was used for roofing in the Bronze Age, and was in common use until the late 19th century.

White wheat bread was historically a high status food, but during the nineteenth century it became in Britain an item of mass consumption, displacing oats, barley and rye from diets in the North of the country.  It became "a sign of a high degree of culture".  After 1860, the enormous expansion of wheat production in the United States flooded the world market, lowering prices by 40%, and (along with the expansion of potato growing) made a major contribution to the nutritional welfare of the poor.

Farming techniques 

Technological advances in soil preparation and seed placement at planting time, use of crop rotation and fertilizers to improve plant growth, and advances in harvesting methods have all combined to promote wheat as a viable crop. When the use of seed drills replaced broadcasting sowing of seed in the 18th century, another great increase in productivity occurred.

Yields of pure wheat per unit area increased as methods of crop rotation were applied to long cultivated land, and the use of fertilizers became widespread. Improved agricultural husbandry has more recently included threshing machines, reaper-binder machines (the 'combine harvester'), tractor-drawn cultivators and planters, and better varieties (see Green Revolution and Norin 10 wheat). Great expansion of wheat production occurred as new arable land was farmed in the Americas and Australia in the 19th and 20th centuries.

Physiology 

Leaves emerge from the shoot apical meristem in a telescoping fashion until the transition to reproduction i.e. flowering. The last leaf produced by a wheat plant is known as the flag leaf. It is denser and has a higher photosynthetic rate than other leaves, to supply carbohydrate to the developing ear. In temperate countries the flag leaf, along with the second and third highest leaf on the plant, supply the majority of carbohydrate in the grain and their condition is paramount to yield formation. Wheat is unusual among plants in having more stomata on the upper (adaxial) side of the leaf, than on the under (abaxial) side. It has been theorised that this might be an effect of it having been domesticated and cultivated longer than any other plant. Winter wheat generally produces up to 15 leaves per shoot and spring wheat up to 9 and winter crops may have up to 35 tillers (shoots) per plant (depending on cultivar).

While the roots of a wheat plant are growing, the plant also accumulates an energy store in its stem, in the form of fructans, which helps the plant to yield under drought and disease pressure, but it has been observed that there is a trade-off between root growth and stem non-structural carbohydrate reserves. Root growth is likely to be prioritised in drought-adapted crops, while stem non-structural carbohydrate is prioritised in varieties developed for countries where disease is a bigger issue.

Depending on variety, wheat may be awned or not awned. Producing awns incurs a cost in grain number, but wheat awns photosynthesise more efficiently than their leaves with regards to water usage, so awns are much more frequent in varieties of wheat grown in hot drought-prone countries than those generally seen in temperate countries. For this reason, awned varieties could become more widely grown due to climate change. In Europe, however, a decline in climate resilience of wheat has been observed.

Genetics and breeding 
In traditional agricultural systems wheat populations often consist of landraces, informal farmer-maintained populations that often maintain high levels of morphological diversity. Although landraces of wheat are no longer grown in Europe and North America, they continue to be important elsewhere. The origins of formal wheat breeding lie in the nineteenth century, when single line varieties were created through selection of seed from a single plant noted to have desired properties. Modern wheat breeding developed in the first years of the twentieth century and was closely linked to the development of Mendelian genetics. The standard method of breeding inbred wheat cultivars is by crossing two lines using hand emasculation, then selfing or inbreeding the progeny. Selections are identified (shown to have the genes responsible for the varietal differences) ten or more generations before release as a variety or cultivar.

Major breeding objectives include high grain yield, good quality, disease and insect resistance and tolerance to abiotic stresses, including mineral, moisture and heat tolerance. The major diseases in temperate environments include the following, arranged in a rough order of their significance from cooler to warmer climates: eyespot, Stagonospora nodorum blotch (also known as glume blotch), yellow or stripe rust, powdery mildew, Septoria tritici blotch (sometimes known as leaf blotch), brown or leaf rust, Fusarium head blight, tan spot and stem rust. In tropical areas, spot blotch (also known as Helminthosporium leaf blight) is also important.

Wheat has also been the subject of mutation breeding, with the use of gamma, x-rays, ultraviolet light, and sometimes harsh chemicals. The varieties of wheat created through these methods are in the hundreds (going as far back as 1960), more of them being created in higher populated countries such as China. Bread wheat with high grain iron and zinc content has been developed through gamma radiation breeding, and through conventional selection breeding.

International wheat breeding is led by CIMMYT in Mexico. ICARDA is another major public sector international wheat breeder, but it was forced to relocate from Syria in the Syrian Civil War.

Pathogens and this crop are constantly in a process of co-evolution. Spore-producing wheat rusts are substantially adapted towards successful spore propagation, which is essentially to say its R. These pathogens tend towards high-R evolutionary attractors.

Yields
The presence of certain versions of wheat genes has been important for crop yields. Genes for the 'dwarfing' trait, first used by Japanese wheat breeders to produce short-stalked wheat, have had a huge effect on wheat yields worldwide, and were major factors in the success of the Green Revolution in Mexico and Asia, an initiative led by Norman Borlaug. Dwarfing genes enable the carbon that is fixed in the plant during photosynthesis to be diverted towards seed production, and they also help prevent the problem of lodging. "Lodging" occurs when an ear stalk falls over in the wind and rots on the ground, and heavy nitrogenous fertilization of wheat makes the grass grow taller and become more susceptible to this problem. By 1997, 81% of the developing world's wheat area was planted to semi-dwarf wheats, giving both increased yields and better response to nitrogenous fertilizer.

T. turgidum subsp. polonicum is known for its longer glumes and grains, has been bred into main wheat lines for its grain size effect, and likely has contributed these traits to T. petropavlovskyi and the Portuguese landrace group "Arrancada".

As with many plants, MADS-box influences flower development, and more specifically, as with other agricultural Poaceae, heavily influences the total weight output at the end of the entire grain growing process. Despite that importance,  little research has been done into MADS-box and other such spikelet and flower genetics in wheat specifically.

Disease resistance
Wild grasses in the genus Triticum and related genera, and grasses such as rye have been a source of many disease-resistance traits for cultivated wheat breeding since the 1930s. Some resistance genes have been identified against Pyrenophora tritici-repentis, especially races 1 and 5, those most problematic in Kazakhstan. Wild relative, Aegilops tauschii is the source of several genes effective against TTKSK/Ug99 - Sr33, Sr45, Sr46, and SrTA1662 - of which Sr33 and SrTA1662 are the work of Olson et al. 2013, and Sr45 and Sr46 are also briefly reviewed therein.

 is an R gene, a dominant negative for partial adult resistance discovered and molecularly characterized by Moore et al. 2015.  Lr67 is effective against all races of leaf, stripe, and stem rusts, and  powdery mildew (Blumeria graminis). This is produced by a mutation of two aminos in what is predicted to be a hexose transporter. The product then heterodimerizes with the susceptible's product, with the downstream result of reducing glucose uptake.
 is widely deployed in cultivars due to its abnormally broad effectiveness, conferring resistance against leaf- and stripe-rusts, and powdery mildew. Krattinger et al. 2009 finds Lr34 to also be an ABC transporter and conclude that this is the probably means of its effectiveness and the reason that it produces a 'slow rusting'/adult resistance phenotype.
  is a widely used powdery mildew resistance introgressed from rye (Secale cereale). It comes from the rye 1R chromosome, a source of many resistances since the 1960s.

 (FHB, Fusarium ear blight) is also an important breeding target. Marker-assisted breeding panels involving kompetitive allele specific PCR can be used. Singh et al. 2019 identify a KASP genetic marker for a pore-forming toxin-like gene providing FHB resistance.

Hybrid wheats
Because wheat self-pollinates, creating hybrid seed is extremely labor-intensive; the high cost of hybrid wheat seed relative to its moderate benefits have kept farmers from adopting them widely despite nearly 90 years of effort.

F1 hybrid wheat cultivars should not be confused with wheat cultivars deriving from standard plant breeding, which may descend from hybrid crosses further back in its ancestry. Heterosis or hybrid vigor (as in the familiar F1 hybrids of maize) occurs in common (hexaploid) wheat, but it is difficult to produce seed of hybrid cultivars on a commercial scale as is done with maize because wheat flowers are perfect in the botanical sense, meaning they have both male and female parts, and normally self-pollinate. Commercial hybrid wheat seed has been produced using chemical hybridizing agents, plant growth regulators that selectively interfere with pollen development, or naturally occurring cytoplasmic male sterility systems. Hybrid wheat has been a limited commercial success in Europe (particularly France), the United States and South Africa.

Synthetic hexaploids made by crossing the wild goatgrass wheat ancestor Aegilops tauschii, and various other Aegilops, and various durum wheats are now being deployed, and these increase the genetic diversity of cultivated wheats.

Triticale: Wheat-rye hybrid
|alt=The smaller grain of wheat on the left, larger kernels of rye midlle, and triticale on the right – triticale grain is significantly larger than wheat]]

In ancient times, wheat was often considered a luxury grain because it had lower yield but better taste and digestibility than competitors like rye. In the 19th century, efforts were made to hybridize the two to get a crop with the best traits of both. This produced triticale, a grain with high potential, but fraught with problems relating to fertility and germination. These have mostly been solved, so that in the 20th century millions of acres of triticale are being grown worldwide.

Gluten
Modern bread wheat varieties have been cross-bred to contain greater amounts of gluten, which affords significant advantages for improving the quality of breads and pastas from a functional point of view. However, a 2020 study that grew and analyzed 60 wheat cultivars from between 1891 and 2010 found no changes in albumin/globulin and gluten contents over time. "Overall, the harvest year had a more significant effect on protein composition than the cultivar. At the protein level, we found no evidence to support an increased immunostimulatory potential of modern winter wheat."

Water efficiency
Stomata (or leaf pores) are involved in both uptake of carbon dioxide gas from the atmosphere and water vapor losses from the leaf due to water transpiration. Basic physiological investigation of these gas exchange processes has yielded valuable carbon isotope based methods that are used for breeding wheat varieties with improved water-use efficiency. These varieties can improve crop productivity in rain-fed dry-land wheat farms.

Insect resistance
The gene Sm1 protects against the orange wheat blossom midge.

Genome
In 2010, a team of UK scientists funded by BBSRC announced they had decoded the wheat genome for the first time (95% of the genome of a variety of wheat known as Chinese Spring line 42). This genome was released in a basic format for scientists and plant breeders to use but was not a fully annotated sequence which was reported in some of the media. On 29 November 2012, an essentially complete gene set of bread wheat was published. Random shotgun libraries of total DNA and cDNA from the T. aestivum cv. Chinese Spring (CS42) were sequenced in Roche 454 pyrosequencer using GS FLX Titanium and GS FLX+ platforms to generate 85 Gb of sequence (220 million reads) and identified between 94,000 and 96,000 genes. The implications of the research in cereal genetics and breeding includes the examination of genome variation, analysis of population genetics and evolutionary biology, and further studying epigenetic modifications. In 2018 an even more complete Chinese Spring genome was released by a different team.

Then in 2020 some of the same researchers produced 15 genome sequences from various locations and varieties around the world – the most complete and detailed so far – along with examples of their own use of the sequences to localize particular insect and disease resistance factors. The team expects these sequences will be useful in future cultivar breeding.

 is controlled by R genes which are highly race-specific.

Genetic engineering

CRISPR/Cas9
For decades the primary genetic modification technique has been non-homologous end joining (NHEJ). However, since its introduction, the / tool has been extensively adopted, for example:
 To intentionally damage three homologs of  TaNP1 (a glucose-methanol-choline oxidoreductase gene) to produce a novel male sterility trait, by Li et al. 2020
 Blumeria graminis f.sp. tritici resistance has been produced by Shan et al. 2013 and Wang et al. 2014 by editing one of the mildew resistance locus o genes (more specifically one of the Triticum aestivum MLO (TaMLO) genes)
 Triticum aestivum EDR1 (TaEDR1) (the EDR1 gene, which inhibits Bmt resistance) has been knocked out by Zhang et al. 2017 to improve that resistance
 Triticum aestivum HRC (TaHRC) has been disabled by Su et al. 2019 thus producing Gibberella zeae resistance.
 Triticum aestivum Ms1 (TaMs1) has been knocked out by Okada et al. 2019 to produce another novel male sterility
 and Triticum aestivum acetolactate synthase (TaALS) and Triticum aestivum acetyl-CoA-carboxylase (TaACC) were subjected to base changes by Zhang et al. 2019 (in two publications) to confer herbicide resistance to ALS inhibitors and ACCase inhibitors respectively

 these examples illustrate the rapid deployment and results that CRISPR/Cas9 has shown in wheat disease resistance improvement.

Varieties
There are around 20 wheat varieties of 7 species grown throughout the world. In Canada different varieties are blended prior to sale. "Identity preserved" wheat that has been stored and transported separately (at extra cost) usually fetches a higher price.

Apart from mutant versions of genes selected in antiquity during domestication, there has been more recent deliberate selection of alleles that affect growth characteristics. Some wheat species are diploid, with two sets of chromosomes, but many are stable polyploids, with four sets of chromosomes (tetraploid) or six (hexaploid).

Einkorn wheat (T. monococcum) is diploid (AA, two complements of seven chromosomes, 2n=14).

Most tetraploid wheats (e.g. emmer and durum wheat) are derived from wild emmer, T. dicoccoides. Wild emmer is itself the result of a hybridization between two diploid wild grasses, T. urartu and a wild goatgrass such as Aegilops searsii or Ae. speltoides. The unknown grass has never been identified among non-extinct wild grasses, but the closest living relative is Aegilops speltoides. The hybridization that formed wild emmer (AABB) occurred in the wild, long before domestication, and was driven by natural selection.

 

Hexaploid wheats evolved in farmers' fields. Either domesticated emmer or durum wheat hybridized with yet another wild diploid grass (Aegilops tauschii) to make the hexaploid wheats, spelt wheat and bread wheat. These have three sets of paired chromosomes, three times as many as in diploid wheat.

At the point of the end userthe farmer who is sowing and reapingthe exact variety they have in their field is usually not known. The development of genetic assays which can distinguish the small differences between cultivars is allowing that question to be answered field-by-field, for the first time.

Major cultivated species of wheat 

Hexaploid species
 Common wheat or bread wheat (T. aestivum) – A hexaploid species that is the most widely cultivated in the world.
 Spelt (T. spelta) – Another hexaploid species cultivated in limited quantities. Spelt is sometimes considered a subspecies of the closely related species common wheat (T. aestivum), in which case its botanical name is considered to be T. aestivum ssp. spelta.
Tetraploid species
 Durum (T. durum) – A tetraploid form of wheat widely used today, and the second most widely cultivated wheat.
 Emmer (T. dicoccum) – A tetraploid species, cultivated in ancient times but no longer in widespread use.
 Khorasan (T. turgidum ssp. turanicum, also called T. turanicum) is a tetraploid wheat species. It is an ancient grain type; Khorasan refers to a historical region in modern-day Afghanistan and the northeast of Iran. This grain is twice the size of modern-day wheat and is known for its rich nutty flavor.
Diploid species
 Einkorn (T. monococcum) – A diploid species with wild and cultivated variants. Domesticated at the same time as emmer wheat.

Hulled versus free-threshing species 

The four wild species of wheat, along with the domesticated varieties einkorn, emmer and spelt, have hulls. This more primitive morphology (in evolutionary terms) consists of toughened glumes that tightly enclose the grains, and (in domesticated wheats) a semi-brittle rachis that breaks easily on threshing.

The result is that when threshed, the wheat ear breaks up into spikelets. To obtain the grain, further processing, such as milling or pounding, is needed to remove the hulls or husks. Hulled wheats are often stored as spikelets because the toughened glumes give good protection against pests of stored grain.

In free-threshing (or naked) forms, such as durum wheat and common wheat, the glumes are fragile and the rachis tough. On threshing, the chaff breaks up, releasing the grains.

Naming 

There are many botanical classification systems used for wheat species, discussed in a separate article on wheat taxonomy. The name of a wheat species from one information source may not be the name of a wheat species in another.

Within a species, wheat cultivars are further classified by wheat breeders and farmers in terms of:
 Growing season, such as winter wheat vs. spring wheat.
 Protein content. Bread wheat protein content ranges from 10% in some soft wheats with high starch contents, to 15% in hard wheats.
 The quality of the wheat protein gluten. This protein can determine the suitability of a wheat to a particular dish. A strong and elastic gluten present in bread wheats enables dough to trap carbon dioxide during leavening, but elastic gluten interferes with the rolling of pasta into thin sheets. The gluten protein in durum wheats used for pasta is strong but not elastic.
 Grain color (red, white or amber). Many wheat varieties are reddish-brown due to phenolic compounds present in the bran layer which are transformed to pigments by browning enzymes. White wheats have a lower content of phenolics and browning enzymes, and are generally less astringent in taste than red wheats. The yellowish color of durum wheat and semolina flour made from it is due to a carotenoid pigment called lutein, which can be oxidized to a colorless form by enzymes present in the grain.

Classes used in North America 
The named classes of wheat in English are more or less the same in Canada as in the US, as broadly the same commercial cash crop strains can be found in both.

The classes used in the United States are:
 Durum – Very hard, translucent, light-colored grain used to make semolina flour for pasta and bulghur; high in protein, specifically, gluten protein.
 Hard Red Spring – Hard, brownish, high-protein wheat used for bread and hard baked goods. Bread flour and high-gluten flours are commonly made from hard red spring wheat. It is primarily traded on the Minneapolis Grain Exchange.
 Hard Red Winter – Hard, brownish, mellow high-protein wheat used for bread, hard baked goods and as an adjunct in other flours to increase protein in pastry flour for pie crusts. Some brands of unbleached all-purpose flours are commonly made from hard red winter wheat alone. It is primarily traded on the Kansas City Board of Trade. Many varieties grown from Kansas south are descendant from a variety known as "turkey red", which was brought to Kansas by Mennonite immigrants from Russia. Marquis wheat was developed to prosper in the shorter growing season in Canada, and is grown as far south as southern Nebraska.
 Soft Red Winter – Soft, low-protein wheat used for cakes, pie crusts, biscuits, and muffins. Cake flour, pastry flour, and some self-rising flours with baking powder and salt added, for example, are made from soft red winter wheat. It is primarily traded on the Chicago Board of Trade.
 Hard White – Hard, light-colored, opaque, chalky, medium-protein wheat planted in dry, temperate areas. Used for bread and brewing.
 Soft White – Soft, light-colored, very low protein wheat grown in temperate moist areas. Used for pie crusts and pastry. Pastry flour, for example, is sometimes made from soft white winter wheat.

Red wheats may need bleaching; therefore, white wheats usually command higher prices than red wheats on the commodities market.

As a food 

Raw wheat can be ground into flour or, using hard durum wheat only, can be ground into semolina; germinated and dried creating malt; crushed or cut into cracked wheat; parboiled (or steamed), dried, crushed and de-branned into bulgur also known as groats. If the raw wheat is broken into parts at the mill, as is usually done, the outer husk or bran can be used in several ways.

Wheat is a major ingredient in such foods as bread, porridge, crackers, biscuits, muesli, pancakes, pasta, pies, pastries, pizza, semolina, cakes, cookies, muffins, rolls, doughnuts, gravy, beer, vodka, boza (a fermented beverage), and breakfast cereals.

In manufacturing wheat products, gluten is valuable to impart viscoelastic functional qualities in dough, enabling the preparation of diverse processed foods such as breads, noodles, and pasta that facilitate wheat consumption.

Nutrition 

In 100 grams, wheat provides  of food energy and is a rich source (20% or more of the Daily Value, DV) of multiple essential nutrients, such as protein, dietary fiber, manganese, phosphorus and niacin (table). Several B vitamins and other dietary minerals are in significant content. Wheat is 13% water, 71% carbohydrates, and 1.5% fat. Its 13% protein content is mostly gluten (75–80% of the protein in wheat).

Wheat proteins have a low quality for human nutrition, according to the new protein quality method (DIAAS) promoted by the Food and Agriculture Organization. Though they contain adequate amounts of the other essential amino acids, at least for adults, wheat proteins are deficient in the essential amino acid lysine. Because the proteins present in the wheat endosperm (gluten proteins) are particularly poor in lysine, white flours are more deficient in lysine compared with whole grains. Significant efforts in plant breeding are being made to develop lysine-rich wheat varieties, without success . Supplementation with proteins from other food sources (mainly legumes) is commonly used to compensate for this deficiency, since the limitation of a single essential amino acid causes the others to break down and become excreted, which is especially important during the period of growth.

 of hard red winter wheat contain about 12.6 g of protein, 1.5 g of total fat, 71 g of carbohydrate (by difference), 12.2 g of dietary fiber, and 3.2 mg of iron (17% of the daily requirement); the same weight of hard red spring wheat contains about 15.4 g of protein, 1.9 g of total fat, 68 g of carbohydrate (by difference), 12.2 g of dietary fiber, and 3.6 mg of iron (20% of the daily requirement).

Worldwide production 

The most common forms of wheat are white and red wheat. However, other natural forms of wheat exist. Other commercially minor but nutritionally promising species of naturally evolved wheat species include black, yellow and blue wheat.

Health effects 
Consumed worldwide by billions of people, wheat is a significant food for human nutrition, particularly in the least developed countries where wheat products are primary foods. When eaten as the whole grain, wheat is a healthy food source of multiple nutrients and dietary fiber recommended for children and adults, in several daily servings containing a variety of foods that meet whole grain-rich criteria. Dietary fiber may also help people feel full and therefore help with a healthy weight. Further, wheat is a major source for natural and biofortified nutrient supplementation, including dietary fiber, protein and dietary minerals.

Manufacturers of foods containing wheat as a whole grain in specified amounts are allowed a health claim for marketing purposes in the United States, stating: "low fat diets rich in fiber-containing grain products, fruits, and vegetables may reduce the risk of some types of cancer, a disease associated with many factors" and "diets low in saturated fat and cholesterol and rich in fruits, vegetables, and grain products that contain some types of dietary fiber, particularly soluble fiber, may reduce the risk of heart disease, a disease associated with many factors". The scientific opinion of the European Food Safety Authority (EFSA) related to health claims on gut health/bowel function, weight control, blood glucose/insulin levels, weight management, blood cholesterol, satiety, glycaemic index, digestive function and cardiovascular health is "that the food constituent, whole grain, (...) is not sufficiently characterised in relation to the claimed health effects" and "that a cause and effect relationship cannot be established between the consumption of whole grain and the claimed effects considered in this opinion."

Concerns 
In genetically susceptible people, gluten – a major part of wheat protein – can trigger coeliac disease. Coeliac disease affects about 1% of the general population in developed countries. There is evidence that most cases remain undiagnosed and untreated. The only known effective treatment is a strict lifelong gluten-free diet.

While coeliac disease is caused by a reaction to wheat proteins, it is not the same as a wheat allergy. Other diseases triggered by eating wheat are non-coeliac gluten sensitivity (estimated to affect 0.5% to 13% of the general population), gluten ataxia, and dermatitis herpetiformis.

It has been speculated that FODMAPs present in wheat (mainly fructans) are the cause of non-coeliac gluten sensitivity. , reviews have concluded that FODMAPs only explain certain gastrointestinal symptoms, such as bloating, but not the extra-digestive symptoms that people with non-coeliac gluten sensitivity may develop, such as neurological disorders, fibromyalgia, psychological disturbances, and dermatitis.

Other proteins present in wheat called amylase-trypsin inhibitors (ATIs) have been identified as the possible activator of the innate immune system in coeliac disease and non-coeliac gluten sensitivity. ATIs are part of the plant's natural defense against insects and may cause toll-like receptor 4 (TLR4)-mediated intestinal inflammation in humans. These TLR4-stimulating activities of ATIs are limited to gluten-containing cereals. A 2017 study in mice demonstrated that ATIs exacerbate preexisting inflammation and might also worsen it at extraintestinal sites. This may explain why there is an increase of inflammation in people with preexisting diseases upon ingestion of ATIs-containing grains.

Comparison with other staple foods 
The following table shows the nutrient content of wheat and other major staple foods in a raw form on a dry weight basis to account for their different water contents.

Raw forms of these staples, however, are not edible and cannot be digested. These must be sprouted, or prepared and cooked as appropriate for human consumption. In sprouted or cooked form, the relative nutritional and anti-nutritional contents of each of these staples is remarkably different from that of the raw form, as reported in this table.

In cooked form, the nutrition value for each staple depends on the cooking method (for example: baking, boiling, steaming, frying, etc.).

Commercial use 

Harvested wheat grain that enters trade is classified according to grain properties for the purposes of the commodity- and international trade markets. Wheat buyers use these to decide which wheat to buy, as each class has special uses, and producers use them to decide which classes of wheat will be most profitable to cultivate.

Wheat is widely cultivated as a cash crop because it produces a good yield per unit area, grows well in a temperate climate even with a moderately short growing season, and yields a versatile, high-quality flour that is widely used in baking. Most breads are made with wheat flour, including many breads named for the other grains they contain, for example, most rye and oat breads. The popularity of foods made from wheat flour creates a large demand for the grain, even in economies with significant food surpluses.

In recent years, low international wheat prices have often encouraged farmers in the United States to change to more profitable crops. In 1998, the price at harvest of a  bushel was $2.68 per. Some information providers, following CBOT practice, quote the wheat market in per ton denomination. A USDA report revealed that in 1998, average operating costs were $1.43 per bushel and total costs were $3.97 per bushel. In that study, farm wheat yields averaged 41.7 bushels per acre (2.2435 metric ton/hectare), and typical total wheat production value was $31,900 per farm, with total farm production value (including other crops) of $173,681 per farm, plus $17,402 in government payments. There were significant profitability differences between low- and high-cost farms, due to crop yield differences, location, and farm size.

Production and consumption 

In 2020, world wheat production was 761 million tonnes, led by China, India, and Russia collectively providing 38% of the world total. , the largest exporters were Russia (32 million tonnes), United States (27), Canada (23) and France (20), while the largest importers were Indonesia (11 million tonnes), Egypt (10.4) and Turkey (10.0).

Historical factors

British Empire and successor states
Wheat became a central agriculture endeavor in the worldwide British Empire in the 19th century, and remains of great importance in Australia, Canada and India. In Australia, with vast lands and a limited work force, expanded production depended on technological advances, especially regarding irrigation and machinery. By the 1840s there were 900 growers in South Australia. They used the "Ridley's Stripper", to remove the heads of grain, and the reaper-harvester perfected by John Ridley in 1843.  By 1850 South Australia had become the granary for the region; soon wheat farming spread to Victoria and New South Wales, with heavy exports to Great Britain. In Canada modern farm implements made large scale wheat farming possible from the late 1840s on. By the 1879s Saskatchewan was the center, followed by Alberta, Manitoba and Ontario, as the spread of railway lines allowed easy exports to Britain. By 1910 wheat made up 22% of Canada's exports, rising to 25% in 1930 despite the sharp decline in prices during the worldwide Great Depression. Efforts to expand wheat production in South Africa, Kenya and India were stymied by low yields and disease. However by 2000 India had become the second largest producer of wheat in the world.

United States

In the 19th century the American wheat frontier moved rapidly westward.  By the 1880s 70% of American exports went to British ports.  The first successful grain elevator was built  in Buffalo in 1842.  The cost of transport fell rapidly.  In 1869 it cost 37 cents to transport a bushel of wheat from Chicago to Liverpool. In 1905 it was 10 cents.

20th century
In the 20th century, global wheat output expanded by about 5-fold, but until about 1955 most of this reflected increases in wheat crop area, with lesser (about 20%) increases in crop yields per unit area. After 1955 however, there was a ten-fold increase in the rate of wheat yield improvement per year, and this became the major factor allowing global wheat production to increase. Thus technological innovation and scientific crop management with synthetic nitrogen fertilizer, irrigation and wheat breeding were the main drivers of wheat output growth in the second half of the century. There were some significant decreases in wheat crop area, for instance in North America.

Better seed storage and germination ability (and hence a smaller requirement to retain harvested crop for next year's seed) is another 20th-century technological innovation. In Medieval England, farmers saved one-quarter of their wheat harvest as seed for the next crop, leaving only three-quarters for food and feed consumption. By 1999, the global average seed use of wheat was about 6% of output.

21st century
Several factors are currently slowing the rate of global expansion of wheat production: population growth rates are falling while wheat yields continue to rise. There is evidence, however, that rising temperatures associated with climate change are reducing wheat yield in several locations. In addition, the better economic profitability of other crops such as soybeans and maize, linked with investment in modern genetic technologies, has promoted shifts to other crops.

Farming systems 

In 2014, the most productive crop yields for wheat were in Ireland, producing 10 tonnes per hectare. In addition to gaps in farming system technology and knowledge, some large wheat grain-producing countries have significant losses after harvest at the farm and because of poor roads, inadequate storage technologies, inefficient supply chains and farmers' inability to bring the produce into retail markets dominated by small shopkeepers. Various studies in India, for example, have concluded that about 10% of total wheat production is lost at farm level, another 10% is lost because of poor storage and road networks, and additional amounts lost at the retail level.

In the Punjab region of the Indian subcontinent, as well as North China, irrigation has been a major contributor to increased grain output. More widely over the last 40 years, a massive increase in fertilizer use together with the increased availability of semi-dwarf varieties in developing countries, has greatly increased yields per hectare. In developing countries, use of (mainly nitrogenous) fertilizer increased 25-fold in this period. However, farming systems rely on much more than fertilizer and breeding to improve productivity. A good illustration of this is Australian wheat growing in the southern winter cropping zone, where, despite low rainfall (300 mm), wheat cropping is successful even with relatively little use of nitrogenous fertilizer. This is achieved by 'rotation cropping' (traditionally called the ley system) with leguminous pastures and, in the last decade, including a canola crop in the rotations has boosted wheat yields by a further 25%. In these low rainfall areas, better use of available soil-water (and better control of soil erosion) is achieved by retaining the stubble after harvesting and by minimizing tillage.

Geographical variation 

There are substantial differences in wheat farming, trading, policy, sector growth, and wheat uses in different regions of the world. The largest exporters of wheat in 2016 were, in order of exported quantities: Russian Federation (25.3 million tonnes), United States (24.0 million tonnes), Canada (19.7 million tonnes), France (18.3 million tonnes), and Australia (16.1 million tonnes). The largest importers of wheat in 2016 were, in order of imported quantities: Indonesia (10.5 million tonnes), Egypt (8.7 million tonnes), Algeria (8.2 million tonnes), Italy (7.7 million tonnes) and Spain (7.0 million tonnes).

In the rapidly developing countries of Asia and Africa, westernization of diets associated with increasing prosperity is leading to growth in per capita demand for wheat at the expense of the other food staples.

Most productive 
The average annual world farm yield for wheat in 2014 was 3.3 tonnes per hectare (330 grams per square meter). Ireland's wheat farms were the most productive in 2014, with a nationwide average of 10.0 tonnes per hectare, followed by the Netherlands (9.2), and Germany, New Zealand and the United Kingdom (each with 8.6).

Futures contracts 
Wheat futures are traded on the Chicago Board of Trade, Kansas City Board of Trade, and Minneapolis Grain Exchange, and have delivery dates in March (H), May (K), July (N), September (U), and December (Z).

Peak wheat

Agronomy

Crop development 
Wheat normally needs between 110 and 130 days between sowing and harvest, depending upon climate, seed type, and soil conditions (winter wheat lies dormant during a winter freeze). Optimal crop management requires that the farmer have a detailed understanding of each stage of development in the growing plants. In particular, spring fertilizers, herbicides, fungicides, and growth regulators are typically applied only at specific stages of plant development. For example, it is currently recommended that the second application of nitrogen is best done when the ear (not visible at this stage) is about 1 cm in size (Z31 on Zadoks scale). Knowledge of stages is also important to identify periods of higher risk from the climate. For example, pollen formation from the mother cell, and the stages between anthesis and maturity, are susceptible to high temperatures, and this adverse effect is made worse by water stress. Farmers also benefit from knowing when the 'flag leaf' (last leaf) appears, as this leaf represents about 75% of photosynthesis reactions during the grain filling period, and so should be preserved from disease or insect attacks to ensure a good yield.

Several systems exist to identify crop stages, with the Feekes and Zadoks scales being the most widely used. Each scale is a standard system which describes successive stages reached by the crop during the agricultural season.

Pests and diseases 
Pests – or pests and diseases, depending on the definition – consume 21.47% of the world's wheat crop annually.

Diseases 

There are many wheat diseases, mainly caused by fungi, bacteria, and viruses. Plant breeding to develop new disease-resistant varieties, and sound crop management practices are important for preventing disease. Fungicides, used to prevent the significant crop losses from fungal disease, can be a significant variable cost in wheat production. Estimates of the amount of wheat production lost owing to plant diseases vary between 10 and 25% in Missouri. A wide range of organisms infect wheat, of which the most important are viruses and fungi.

The main wheat-disease categories are:
 Seed-borne diseases: these include seed-borne scab, seed-borne Stagonospora (previously known as Septoria), common bunt (stinking smut), and loose smut. These are managed with fungicides.
 Leaf- and head- blight diseases: Powdery mildew, leaf rust, Septoria tritici leaf blotch, Stagonospora (Septoria) nodorum leaf and glume blotch, and Fusarium head scab.
 Crown and root rot diseases: Two of the more important of these are 'take-all' and Cephalosporium stripe. Both of these diseases are soil borne.
 Stem rust diseases: Caused by Puccinia graminis f. sp. tritici (basidiomycete) fungi e.g. Ug99
 Wheat blast: Caused by Magnaporthe oryzae Triticum.
 Viral diseases: Wheat spindle streak mosaic (yellow mosaic) and barley yellow dwarf are the two most common viral diseases. Control can be achieved by using resistant varieties.

Animal pests 
Wheat is used as a food plant by the larvae of some Lepidoptera (butterfly and moth) species including the flame, rustic shoulder-knot, setaceous Hebrew character and turnip moth. Early in the season, many species of birds and rodents feed upon wheat crops. These animals can cause significant damage to a crop by digging up and eating newly planted seeds or young plants. They can also damage the crop late in the season by eating the grain from the mature spike. Recent post-harvest losses in cereals amount to billions of dollars per year in the United States alone, and damage to wheat by various borers, beetles and weevils is no exception. Rodents can also cause major losses during storage, and in major grain growing regions, field mice numbers can sometimes build up explosively to plague proportions because of the ready availability of food. To reduce the amount of wheat lost to post-harvest pests, Agricultural Research Service scientists have developed an "insect-o-graph", which can detect insects in wheat that are not visible to the naked eye. The device uses electrical signals to detect the insects as the wheat is being milled. The new technology is so precise that it can detect 5–10 infested seeds out of 30,000 good ones. Tracking insect infestations in stored grain is critical for food safety as well as for the marketing value of the crop.

See also 

 Bran
 Chaff
 Effects of climate change on agriculture
 Gluten-free diet
 Mushroom production on wheat stalks
 Intermediate wheatgrass: a perennial alternative to wheat
 Taxonomy of wheat
 Wheatberry
 Wheat germ oil
 Wheat production in the United States
 Wheat middlings
 Whole-wheat flour

References

Further reading 
 The World Wheat Book : A History of Wheat Breeding
 
 
 
 
 Jasny Naum, The Wheats of Classical Antiquity. Hopkins Press, Baltimore 1944. .
 Nelson, Scott Reynolds (2022). Oceans of Grain: How American Wheat Remade the World. Excerpt.

External links 

 Triticum species at Purdue University

 
Crops
Energy crops
Poaceae genera
Staple foods
Taxa named by Carl Linnaeus